Isabelle Strunc (born 8 March 1991) is a French professional basketball player.

Career

Ligue Féminine
Strunc began her professional career in France's Ligue Féminine de Basketball, with Centre Fédéral, a team run by the FFBB to develop future national talents. She then moved to Pays d'Aix Basket for two seasons, followed by Perpignan Basket for another two seasons. After a year away in Australia, Strunc returned to LFB with Cavigal Nice Basket. She has won Ligue Féminine 2 on two occasions, acting instrumental in the promotions of Perpignan (2012) and Nice (2015).

Australia
In 2013, Strunc was signed by the Canberra Capitals in the Women's National Basketball League. Abby Bishop, former teammate at Perpignan Basket, was instrumental in her signing.

National team
Strunc made her international debut with the French national team at the 2007 FIBA Europe Under-16 Championship. She has medalled for France on two occasions. She made her world championship debut when she would play at the 2009 FIBA Under-19 World Championship in the Thailand, France would place 7th.

References

1991 births
Living people
Canberra Capitals players
French women's basketball players
French expatriate basketball people in Australia
Guards (basketball)